Heartstones is a novella by British author Ruth Rendell, published in 1987. It was also published by Longman in a special educational edition in 1990.

1987 British novels
Novels by Ruth Rendell
Hutchinson (publisher) books
British novellas
Harper & Row books